Agaraea atrivena is a moth of the family Erebidae. It was described by Paul Dognin in 1911. It is found in Colombia.

References

Moths described in 1911
Arctiinae of South America
Moths of South America